Maria Julia, Marquesa de Varela (née Marin) is a Uruguayan media executive specialising in celebrity interviews. She was nicknamed "The Nutty Marquesa" by The New York Times for her court case with Michael Douglas and Catherine Zeta-Jones.

De Varela, who was born in Montevideo and gained her title after marrying Spanish aristocrat the Marques Enrique de Varela, has three children: Valeria de Montenegro (a former model), Natalia de Montenegro (an interior designer), and Bruno Varela (who is married to TV presenter Hannah Sandling). She is a self-made millionaire, with a house in London and an apartment in New York City. She and Spanish owner of ¡Hola! Eduardo Sanchez Junco own the Hello! print media brand internationally.

References

Living people
Year of birth missing (living people)